Mona Khalidi is the Assistant Dean of Student Affairs and the  Assistant Director of Graduate Studies of the School of International and Public Affairs at Columbia University.   She is married to Columbia University historian Rashid Khalidi.

In the late 1970s and early 1980s Khalidi "worked at Wafa, the official news agency of the"  Palestine Liberation Organization.

She is President of the Arab American Action Network, an organization that acts as an advocate for Palestinian issues and for women's issues.

References

Living people
Khalidi family
Year of birth missing (living people)